Lime Village (Hekdichen Hdakaq'  in Dena'ina) is a census-designated place (CDP) in Bethel Census Area, Alaska, United States. The 2010 census found a population of 29, down from 46 in 2000. It has also been known as Hungry Village.

In July 2008, Lime Village gained notoriety  when it was reported that their gasoline prices were more than double of the already-high national average of over $4/gallon with Lime Village selling regular unleaded gasoline at $8.55/gallon. The high prices were considered ironic considering that Alaska is one of the main suppliers of oil in the United States, but have the highest state average due to scattered villages throughout Alaska such as Lime Village making it difficult to transport oil and other goods.

Geography
Lime Village is located at  (61.341383, -155.490944).

Demographics

Lime Village first appeared on the 1940 U.S. Census as the unincorporated village of Hungry. It did not appear on the 1960 census. It returned in 1970 as Lime Village. It was made a census-designated place (CDP) in 1980.

2000

As of the census of 2000, there were 6 people, 5 households, and 0 families residing in the CDP. The population density was 0.1 people per square mile (0.0/km2). There were 24 housing units at an average density of 0.3/sq mi (0.1/km2). The racial makeup of the CDP was 83.33% White, and 16.67% from two or more races.

There were 5 households, out of which none were married couples  living together, and 100.0% were non-families. 80.0% of all households were made up of individuals, and none had someone living alone who was 65 years of age or older. The average household size was 1.20 and the average family size was 0.00.

In the CDP the population was spread out, with 66.7% from 25 to 44, 33.3% from 45 to 64. The median age was 44 years. For every 100 females, there were 200.0 males. For every 100 females age 18 and over, there were 200.0 males.

2010
As of the census of 2010, there were 29 people and 11 households. The population density was 0.1 people per square mile (0.0/km2). There were 24 housing units at an average density of 0.3/sq mi (0.1/km2). The racial makeup of the CDP was 3.4% White, 93.1% Native American (79.3% specified Alaska Native), and 3.4% from two or more races.

School
The Lime Village School, formerly operated by the Iditarod Area School District, closed in 2007, when the enrollment of six students failed to meet the state-mandated minimum of ten students. As of Fall 2008 the school remained closed. The lack of access to local schooling has increased urban migration, though many migrants continue to spend summers in the village.

References

Census-designated places in Alaska
Census-designated places in Bethel Census Area, Alaska
Census-designated places in Unorganized Borough, Alaska